Franz Schubert's compositions of 1819 are mostly in the Deutsch catalogue (D) range D 633–678, and include:
 Instrumental works:
 Trout Quintet, D 667 (year of composition however uncertain)
 Piano Sonata in C-sharp minor, D 655
 Piano Sonata in A major, D 664 (or 1825?)
 Vocal music:
 Mass No. 5, D 678 (first version started in 1819)
 Die Zwillingsbrüder, D 647
 "Prometheus", D 674

Table

Legend

List

|-
| 633
| 633
| data-sort-value="057,1826-1" | 57,1(1826)
| data-sort-value="2003,179" | XX, 3No. 179
| data-sort-value="403,00" | IV, 3
| data-sort-value="Schmetterling, Der" | Der Schmetterling
| data-sort-value="text Wie soll ich nicht tanzen" | Wie soll ich nicht tanzen
| data-sort-value="1819-01-01" | 1819–1823?
| data-sort-value="Text by Schlegel, Friedrich von from Abendrote I 07" | Text by Schlegel, F., from Abendröte I, 7
|-
| 634
| 634
| data-sort-value="057,1826-2" | 57,2(1826)
| data-sort-value="2003,180" | XX, 3No. 180
| data-sort-value="403,00" | IV, 3
| data-sort-value="Berge, Die" | Die Berge
| data-sort-value="text Sieht uns der Blick gehoben" | Sieht uns der Blick gehoben
| data-sort-value="1819-01-01" | 1819–1823?
| data-sort-value="Text by Schlegel, Friedrich von from Abendrote I 01" | Text by Schlegel, F., from Abendröte I, 1
|- id="D 635"
| 635
| 635
| data-sort-value="XXX,1900" | (1900)(1906–1907)
| data-sort-value="ZZZZ" |
| data-sort-value="304,44" | III, 4No. 44
| data-sort-value="Leise, leise lasst uns singen" | Leise, leise laßt uns singen, later also: Ruhe, and: (Nächtliches) Ständchen
| data-sort-value="text Leise, leise lasst uns singen" | Leise, leise laßt uns singen, schlummre sanft (later also: Leise, leise laßt uns singen, still schon sieht der Mond)
| data-sort-value="1819-01-01" | 
| For ttbb; later text versions, from 1900, by Robert Graf and Anton Weiß
|-
| 636
| 636
| data-sort-value="039,1826-0" | 39(1826)(1895)(1975)
| data-sort-value="2006,357" | XX, 6No. 357
| data-sort-value="402,0390" | IV, 2a &b No. 9
| data-sort-value="Sehnsucht, D 636" | Sehnsucht, D 636
| data-sort-value="text Ach, aus dieses Tales Grunden 2" | Ach, aus dieses Tales Gründen
| data-sort-value="1821-01-01" | early1821?
| data-sort-value="Text by Schiller, Friedrich, Ach, aus dieses Tales Grunden 2" | Text by Schiller; Three versions: 1st not in AGA – 3rd is Op. 39
|-
| 637
| 637
| data-sort-value="087,1827-2" | 87,2(1827)
| data-sort-value="2006,358" | XX, 6No. 358
| data-sort-value="404,00" | IV, 4
| data-sort-value="Hoffnung, D 637" | (Die) Hoffnung, D 637
| data-sort-value="text Es reden und traumen die Menschen viel 2" | Es reden und träumen die Menschen viel
| data-sort-value="1819-01-01" | ?
| data-sort-value="Text by Schiller, Friedrich, Es reden und traumen die Menschen viel 2" | Text by Schiller
|-
| 638
| 638
| data-sort-value="087,1827-3" | 87,3(1827)(1895)
| data-sort-value="2006,359" | XX, 6No. 359
| data-sort-value="404,00" | IV, 4
| data-sort-value="Jungling am Bache, Der, D 638" | Der Jüngling am Bache, D 638
| data-sort-value="text An der Quelle sass der Knabe 3" | An der Quelle saß der Knabe
| data-sort-value="1819-04-01" | April 1819
| data-sort-value="Text by Schiller, Friedrich, An der Quelle sass der Knabe 3" | Text by Schiller (other settings:  and 192); Two versions: 2nd is Op. 87 No. 3
|-
| data-sort-value="639" | 639949
| 639
| data-sort-value="XXX,1820" | (1820)(1832)
| data-sort-value="2009,553" | XX, 9No. 553
| data-sort-value="405,00" | IV, 5
| Widerschein
| data-sort-value="text Fischer harrt am Bruckenbogen" | Fischer harrt am Brückenbogen; Tom Lehnt harrend auf der Brücke
| data-sort-value="1828-05-01" | 1820;May/Sept.1828
|-
| 641
| data-sort-value="999.0598" | 598
| data-sort-value="ZZZZ" |

| data-sort-value="ZZZZ" |

| data-sort-value="ZZZZ" |

| data-sort-value="ZZZZ" |

| data-sort-value="ZZZZ" |

| data-sort-value="ZZZZ" |

| See 
|-
| 642
| 642
| data-sort-value="XXX,1937" | (1937)
| data-sort-value="ZZZZ" |
| data-sort-value="302,01" | III, 2aNo. 1
| Viel tausend Sterne prangen
| data-sort-value="text Viel tausend Sterne prangen" | Viel tausend Sterne prangen
| data-sort-value="1812-01-01" | 1812?
| data-sort-value="Text by Eberhard, Christian August Gottlob, Viel tausend Sterne prangen" | Text by Eberhard; For satb and piano
|-
| 643
| 643
| data-sort-value="XXX,1889" | (1889)
| data-sort-value="1200,021" | XIINo. 21
| data-sort-value="726,00" | VII/2, 6
| German Dance and Écossaise
| data-sort-value="key C-sharp minor" | C minor (German dance)D major (Écossaise)
| data-sort-value="1819-01-01" | 1819
| For piano
|-
| data-sort-value="999.06431" |
| data-sort-value="643.1" | 643A
| data-sort-value="XXX,1972" | (1972)
| data-sort-value="ZZZZ" |
| data-sort-value="302,11" | III, 2aNo. 11
| data-sort-value="Grab, Das, D 643A" | Das Grab, D 643A
| data-sort-value="text Das Grab ist tief und stille 5" | Das Grab ist tief und stille
| data-sort-value="1819-01-01" | 1819
| data-sort-value="Text by Salis-Seewis, Johann Gaudenz von, Das Grab ist tief und stille 5" | Text by Salis-Seewis (other settings: , 330, 377 and 569); For satb
|-
| 644
| 644
| data-sort-value="XXX,1855" | (1855)(1887)(1891)(1975)
| data-sort-value="1504,007" | XV, 4No. 7
| data-sort-value="204,00" | II, 4
| data-sort-value="Zauberharfe, Die" | Die Zauberharfe
| data-sort-value="theatre (Incidental music)" | (Incidental music)Was belebt die schöne Welt? (Romanze from No. 9) – Durch der Töne Zaubermacht (final choir)
| data-sort-value="1820-08-01" | Apr.–Aug.1820
|-
| 645
| 645
| data-sort-value="ZZZZ" |
| data-sort-value="ZZZZ" |
| data-sort-value="412,00" | IV, 12
| Abend, D 645
| data-sort-value="text Wie ist es denn, dass trub und schwer" | Wie ist es denn, daß trüb und schwer
| data-sort-value="1819-01-01" | early 1819
| data-sort-value="Text by Tieck, Ludwig, Wie ist es denn, dass trub und schwer" | Text by Tieck; Fragment of a sketch
|-
| 646
| 646
| data-sort-value="XXX,1885" | (1885)
| data-sort-value="2006,350" | XX, 6No. 350
| data-sort-value="412,00" | IV, 12
| data-sort-value="Gebusche, Die" | Die Gebüsche
| data-sort-value="text Es wehet kuhl und leise" | Es wehet kühl und leise
| data-sort-value="1819-01-01" | January1819
| data-sort-value="Text by Schlegel, Friedrich von from Abendrote II 09" | Text by Schlegel, F., from Abendröte II, 9
|-
| 647
| 647
| data-sort-value="XXX,1872" | (1872)(1889)
| data-sort-value="1503,005" | XV, 3No. 5
| data-sort-value="205,00" | II, 5
| data-sort-value="Zwillingsbruder, Die" | Die Zwillingsbrüder
| data-sort-value="theatre (Singspiel)" | (Singspiel)
| data-sort-value="1819-01-01" | Oct. 1818–1819
| For stbbbSATB and orchestra (piano reduction in 1872 edition); Overture and Nos. 1–10
|-
| 648
| 648
| data-sort-value="XXX,1886" | (1886)
| data-sort-value="0200,007" | II No. 7
| data-sort-value="505,08" | V, 5
| Overture, D 648
| data-sort-value="key E minor" | E minor
| data-sort-value="1819-02-01" | February1819
| For orchestra
|-
| 649
| 649
| data-sort-value="065,1826-2" | 65,2(1826)
| data-sort-value="2006,351" | XX, 6No. 351
| data-sort-value="403,00" | IV, 3
| data-sort-value="Wanderer, Der, D 649" | Der Wanderer, D 649
| data-sort-value="text Wie deutlich des Mondes Licht zu mir spricht" | Wie deutlich des Mondes Licht zu mir spricht
| data-sort-value="1819-02-01" | February1819
| data-sort-value="Text by Schlegel, Friedrich von from Abendrote II 01" | Text by Schlegel, F., from Abendröte II, 1; Two versions: 2nd is Op. 65 No. 2
|-
| 650
| 650
| data-sort-value="XXX,1831" | (1831)
| data-sort-value="2006,352" | XX, 6No. 352
| data-sort-value="412,00" | IV, 12
| Abendbilder
| data-sort-value="text Still beginnt's im Hain zu tauen" | Still beginnt's im Hain zu tauen
| data-sort-value="1819-02-01" | February1819
| data-sort-value="Text by Silbert, Johann Peter, Still beginnt's im Hain zu tauen" | Text by 
|-
| 651
| 651
| data-sort-value="XXX,1831" | (1831)
| data-sort-value="2006,353" | XX, 6No. 353
| data-sort-value="412,00" | IV, 12
| Himmelsfunken
| data-sort-value="text Der Odem Gottes weht" | Der Odem Gottes weht
| data-sort-value="1819-02-01" | February1819
| data-sort-value="Text by Silbert, Johann Peter, Der Odem Gottes weht" | Text by 
|-
| 652
| 652
| data-sort-value="XXX,1842" | (1842)
| data-sort-value="2006,354" | XX, 6No. 354
| data-sort-value="412,00" | IV, 12
| data-sort-value="Madchen, Das, D 652" | Das Mädchen, D 652
| data-sort-value="text Wie so innig, mocht ich sagen" | Wie so innig, möcht ich sagen
| data-sort-value="1819-02-01" | February1819
| data-sort-value="Text by Schlegel, Friedrich von from Abendrote II 04" | Text by Schlegel, F., from Abendröte II, 4; Two versions: 1st, in AGA, publ. 1842
|-
| 653
| 653
| data-sort-value="XXX,1842" | (1842)
| data-sort-value="2006,355" | XX, 6No. 355
| data-sort-value="412,00" | IV, 12
| Bertas Lied in der Nacht
| data-sort-value="text Nacht umhullt mit wehendem Flugel" | Nacht umhüllt mit wehendem Flügel
| data-sort-value="1819-02-01" | February1819
| data-sort-value="Text by Grillparzer, Franz, Nacht umhullt mit wehendem Flugel" | Text by Grillparzer
|-
| 654
| 654
| data-sort-value="XXX,1842" | (1842)
| data-sort-value="2006,356" | XX, 6No. 356
| data-sort-value="412,00" | IV, 12
| An die Freunde
| data-sort-value="text Im Wald, im Wald, da grabt mich ein" | Im Wald, im Wald, da grabt mich ein
| data-sort-value="1819-03-01" | March 1819
| data-sort-value="Text by Mayrhofer, Johann, Im Wald, im Wald, da grabt mich ein" | Text by Mayrhofer
|-
| 655
| 655
| data-sort-value="XXX,1897" | (1897)
| data-sort-value="2102,013" | XXI, 2No. 13
| data-sort-value="722,10" | VII/2, 2
| Piano Sonata, D 655
| data-sort-value="key C-sharp minor" | C minor
| data-sort-value="1819-04-01" | April 1819
| Allegro; Fragment
|-
| 656
| 656
| data-sort-value="XXX,1867" | (1867)
| data-sort-value="1600,035" | XVINo. 35
| data-sort-value="304,45" | III, 4No. 45
| data-sort-value="Sehnsucht, D 656" | Sehnsucht, D 656
| data-sort-value="text Nur wer die Sehnsucht kennt 4" | Nur wer die Sehnsucht kennt
| data-sort-value="1819-04-01" | April 1819
| data-sort-value="Text by Goethe, Johann Wolfgang von from Wilhelm Meister's Apprenticeship, Nur wer die Sehnsucht kennt 4" | Text by Goethe, from Wilhelm Meister's Apprenticeship (other settings: , 359, 481 and 877 Nos. 1 & 4); For ttbbb
|-
| 657
| 657
| data-sort-value="XXX,1871" | (1871)
| data-sort-value="1600,036" | XVINo. 36
| data-sort-value="304,46" | III, 4No. 46
| data-sort-value="Ruhe, schonstes Gluck der Erde" | Ruhe, schönstes Glück der Erde
| data-sort-value="text Ruhe, schonstes Gluck der Erde" | Ruhe, schönstes Glück der Erde
| data-sort-value="1819-04-01" | April 1819
| For ttbb
|-
| 658
| 658
| data-sort-value="XXX,1895" | (1895)
| data-sort-value="2006,364" | XX, 6No. 364
| data-sort-value="412,00" | IV, 12
| Marie
| data-sort-value="text Ich sehe dich in tausend Bildern" | Ich sehe dich in tausend Bildern
| data-sort-value="1819-05-01" | May 1819?
| data-sort-value="Text by Novalis from Geistliche Lieder No. 15" | Text by Novalis, No. 15 from 
|-
| 659
| 659
| data-sort-value="XXX,1872" | (1872)
| data-sort-value="2006,360" | XX, 6No. 360
| data-sort-value="412,00" | IV, 12
| Hymn I
| data-sort-value="text Wenige wissen das Geheimnis der Liebe" | Wenige wissen das Geheimnis der Liebe
| data-sort-value="1819-05-01" | May 1819
| data-sort-value="Text by Novalis from Geistliche Lieder No. 07" | Text by Novalis, No. 7 from 
|-
| 660
| 660
| data-sort-value="XXX,1872" | (1872)
| data-sort-value="2006,361" | XX, 6No. 361
| data-sort-value="412,00" | IV, 12
| Hymn II
| data-sort-value="text Wenn ich ihn nur habe" | Wenn ich ihn nur habe
| data-sort-value="1819-05-01" | May 1819
| data-sort-value="Text by Novalis from Geistliche Lieder No. 05" | Text by Novalis, No. 5 from 
|-
| 661
| 661
| data-sort-value="XXX,1872" | (1872)
| data-sort-value="2006,362" | XX, 6No. 362
| data-sort-value="412,00" | IV, 12
| Hymn III
| data-sort-value="text Wenn alle untreu werden" | Wenn alle untreu werden
| data-sort-value="1819-05-01" | May 1819
| data-sort-value="Text by Novalis from Geistliche Lieder No. 06" | Text by Novalis, No. 6 from 
|-
| 662
| 662
| data-sort-value="XXX,1872" | (1872)
| data-sort-value="2006,363" | XX, 6No. 363
| data-sort-value="412,00" | IV, 12
| Hymn IV
| data-sort-value="text Ich sag' es jedem, dass er lebt" | Ich sag' es jedem, daß er lebt
| data-sort-value="1819-05-01" | May 1819
| data-sort-value="Text by Novalis from Geistliche Lieder No. 09" | Text by Novalis, No. 9 from 
|-
| 663
| 663
| data-sort-value="ZZZZ" |
| data-sort-value="ZZZZ" |
| data-sort-value="412,00" | IV, 12
| Psalm 13 (12)
| data-sort-value="text Ach Herr, wie lange willst du mein so ganz vergessen?" | Ach Herr, wie lange willst du mein so ganz vergessen?
| data-sort-value="1819-06-01" | June 1819
| data-sort-value="Text by Mendelssohn, Moses translating Psalm 13" | Text by Mendelssohn, M., translating Psalm 13; Fragment
|-
| 664
| 664
| data-sort-value="120,1829-0" | 120p(1829)
| data-sort-value="1000,010" | X No. 10
| data-sort-value="722,02" | VII/2, 2No. 11
| Piano Sonata, D 664
| data-sort-value="key A major" | A major
| data-sort-value="1819-06-21" | Summer 1819or 1825
| Allegro moderato – Andante – Allegro
|-
| 665
| data-sort-value="999.0609" | 609
| data-sort-value="ZZZZ" |

| data-sort-value="ZZZZ" |

| data-sort-value="ZZZZ" |

| data-sort-value="ZZZZ" |

| data-sort-value="ZZZZ" |

| data-sort-value="ZZZZ" |

| See 
|-
| 666
| 666
| data-sort-value="158,1849-0" | 158p(1849)
| data-sort-value="1900,003" | XIXNo. 3
| data-sort-value="302,12" | III, 2aNo. 12
| Kantate zum Geburtstag des Sängers Johann Michael Vogl
| data-sort-value="text Sanger, der von Herzen singet" | Sänger, der von Herzen singet – Diese Berge sah'n dich blühen – Da saht ihr Oresten scheiden – Gott bewahr' dein teures Leben
| data-sort-value="1819-08-10" | 10/08/1819
|-
| 667
| 667
| data-sort-value="114,1829-0" | 114p(1829)
| data-sort-value="0701,001" | VII, 1No. 1
| data-sort-value="607,06" | VI, 7 No. 6
| Trout Quintet
| data-sort-value="key A major" | A major
| data-sort-value="1819-01-01" | 1819?
| Allegro vivace – Andante – Scherzo – Theme and variations – Allegro giusto; For violin, viola, cello, double bass and piano; Reuses music of 
|-
| 668
| 668
| data-sort-value="XXX,1897" | (1897)
| data-sort-value="2102,006" | XXI, 2No. 6
| data-sort-value="715,03" | VII/1, 5No. 3
| Overture, D 668
| data-sort-value="key G minor" | G minor
| data-sort-value="1819-10-01" | October1819
| For piano duet
|-
| 669
| 669
| data-sort-value="XXX,1829" | (1829)
| data-sort-value="2006,365" | XX, 6No. 365
| data-sort-value="412,00" | IV, 12
| Beim Winde
| data-sort-value="text Es traumen die Wolken" | Es traümen die Wolken
| data-sort-value="1819-10-01" | October1819
| data-sort-value="Text by Mayrhofer, Johann, Es traumen die Wolken" | Text by Mayrhofer
|-
| 670
| 670
| data-sort-value="165,1862-2" | 165p,2(1862)
| data-sort-value="2006,366" | XX, 6No. 366
| data-sort-value="412,00" | IV, 12
| data-sort-value="Sternennachte, Die" | Die Sternennächte
| data-sort-value="text In monderhellten Nachten" | In monderhellten Nächten
| data-sort-value="1819-10-01" | October1819
| data-sort-value="Text by Mayrhofer, Johann, In monderhellten Nachten" | Text by Mayrhofer; Two versions: 2nd is Op. posth. 165 No. 2
|-
| 671
| 671
| data-sort-value="XXX,1849" | (1849)
| data-sort-value="2006,367" | XX, 6No. 367
| data-sort-value="412,00" | IV, 12
| Trost, D 671
| data-sort-value="text Hornerklange rufen klagend" | Hörnerklänge rufen klagend
| data-sort-value="1819-10-01" | October1819
| data-sort-value="Text by Mayrhofer, Johann, Hornerklange rufen klagend" | Text by Mayrhofer
|-
| 672
| 672
| data-sort-value="036,1825-2" | 36,2(1825)(1975)
| data-sort-value="2006,368" | XX, 6No. 368
| data-sort-value="402,0362" | IV, 2a &b No. 5
| data-sort-value="Nachtstuck" | Nachtstück
| data-sort-value="text Wenn uber Berge sich der Nebel breitet" | Wenn über Berge sich der Nebel breitet
| data-sort-value="1819-10-01" | October1819
| data-sort-value="Text by Mayrhofer, Johann, Wenn uber Berge sich der Nebel breitet" | Text by Mayrhofer; Two versions: 2nd is Op. 36 No. 2
|-
| 673
| 673
| data-sort-value="165,1832-1" | 165p,1(1832)(1862)
| data-sort-value="2006,369" | XX, 6No. 369
| data-sort-value="412,00" | IV, 12
| data-sort-value="Liebende schreibt, Die" | Die Liebende schreibt
| data-sort-value="text Ein Blick von deinen Augen" | Ein Blick von deinen Augen
| data-sort-value="1819-10-01" | October1819
| data-sort-value="Text by Goethe, Johann Wolfgang von, Ein Blick von deinen Augen" | Text by Goethe; Two versions: 1st publ. in 1832 – 2nd is Op. posth. 165 No. 1
|-
| 674
| 674
| data-sort-value="XXX,1850" | (1850)
| data-sort-value="2006,370" | XX, 6No. 370
| data-sort-value="412,00" | IV, 12
| Prometheus, D 674
| data-sort-value="text Bedecke deinen Himmel, Zeus" | Bedecke deinen Himmel, Zeus
| data-sort-value="1819-10-01" | October1819
| data-sort-value="Text by Goethe, Johann Wolfgang von, Bedecke deinen Himmel, Zeus" | Text by Goethe; For b and piano
|-
| 675
| 675
| data-sort-value="034,1825-0" | 34(1825)
| data-sort-value="0902,008" | IX, 2No. 8
| data-sort-value="715,04" | VII/1, 5No. 4
| Overture, D 675
| data-sort-value="key F major" | F major
| data-sort-value="1819-11-01" | November1819?
| For piano duet
|-
| 676
| 676
| data-sort-value="153,1845-0" | 153p(1845)(1888)
| data-sort-value="1400,003" | XIV No. 3
| data-sort-value="108,00" | I, 8
| Salve Regina, D 676, a.k.a. Drittes Offertorium
| data-sort-value="key A major" | A majorSalve Regina
| data-sort-value="1819-11-01" | November1819
| data-sort-value="Text: Salve Regina 5" | Text: Salve Regina (other settings: , 106, 223, 386 and 811); For s and orchestra; Shortened in 1st ed., Op. posth. 153
|-
| 677
| 677
| data-sort-value="XXX,1848" | (1848)(1895)
| data-sort-value="2006,371" | XX, 6No. 371
| data-sort-value="412,00" | IV, 12
| data-sort-value="Gotter Griechenlands, Die, Stanza from" | Stanza from "Die Götter Griechenlands"
| data-sort-value="text Schone Welt, wo bist du?" | Schöne Welt, wo bist du?
| data-sort-value="1819-11-01" | November1819
| data-sort-value="Text by Schiller, Friedrich, Schone Welt, wo bist du?" | Text by Schiller; Two versions: 2nd publ. in 1848
|-
| 678
| 678
| data-sort-value="XXX,1875" | (1875)(1887)
| data-sort-value="1302,005" | XIII, 2No. 5
| data-sort-value="103,00" | I, 3
| Mass No. 5
| data-sort-value="key A-flat major" | A majorKyrie – Gloria – Credo – Sanctus & Benedictus – Agnus Dei
| data-sort-value="1822-09-01" | Nov. 1819–Sept. 1822
| data-sort-value="Text: Mass ordinary 11" | Text: Mass ordinary (other settings: , 31, 45, 49, 56, 66, 105, 167, 324, 452, 755 and 950); For satbSATB and orchestra; Two versions: 1st publ. in 1875 – 2nd in AGA
|}

Lists of compositions by Franz Schubert
Compositions by Franz Schubert
Schubert